Pashmak, Iran may refer to:
Pashmak-e Towq Tamish
Pashmak Panadeh